Flesh 'n' Blood is an American sitcom television series created by Michael J. DiGaetano and Lawrence Gay, that aired on NBC from September 19 to November 15, 1991, as part of its 1991 fall lineup. The series was created and executive produced by Michael J. Di Gaetano and Lawrence Gay.

Synopsis
Flesh 'n' Blood is the story of Baltimore Assistant District Attorney Rachel Brennan (Lisa Darr), an attractive, driven young woman who had almost everything, including overwhelming political ambition and the talent to back it up.  The one major thing which she lacked was her birth family – she was acutely aware of how her birth mother had put her up for adoption, and longed to meet her.

While Rachel's birth mother didn't miraculously turn up during this program's brief run, someone else did, namely Arlo Weed (David Keith), a Southern redneck and something of a con man. Claiming to be Rachel's brother, Arlo was a widower with three children who made himself at home in Rachel's home and in her life, spicing it up with his homely aphorisms and general manner of rural conviviality.  Other characters included Rachel's ambitious investigator, Marty Travers (among his ambitions were to be romantically involved with Rachel and to be governor of Maryland; both were hampered by his extremely diminutive stature; he was portrayed by actor Perry Anzilotti), and Irene (Peri Gilpin), Rachel's secretary who soon developed designs on Arlo.  Whether anything was to become of these schemes is unknown; Flesh 'n' Blood was not successful in attracting an audience and was cancelled less than two months after its premiere.

Cast
Perry Anzilotti.....Marty Travers
Lisa Darr.....Rachel Brennan
Chris Stacy.....King Weed
Meghan Andrews.....Beauty Weed
David Keith.....Arlo Weed
Peri Gilpin.....Irene

Episodes

Awards and nominations

References
Brooks, Tim and Marsh, Earle, The Complete Directory to Prime Time Network and Cable TV Shows

External links
  
 

1991 American television series debuts
1991 American television series endings
1990s American sitcoms
Television series about adoption
NBC original programming
Television series by CBS Studios
Television shows set in Baltimore
English-language television shows